The Copa de Confraternidad Rioplatense Escobar-Gerona was an official football competition organized by both bodies, the Argentine and Uruguayan football association, being first held in 1941.

The Cup was played between the Primera División runners-up of Argentina and Uruguay, with a two match format, played in each country. This competition was played simultaneously with the Copa Aldao (also known as "Copa Río de la Plata", played by the champions of Argentine and Uruguayan associations).

The trophy was donated by Mr. Ramiro Jouan and named after Adrián Escobar and Héctor Gerona, presidents of the Argentine and Uruguayan associations respectively.

Champions

All-time top goalscorers

Notes

References

E